This is a list of commercial banks in South Africa

Banks

Locally controlled banks 
 Absa Group Limited
 African Bank Limited
 Bidvest Bank Limited
 Capitec Bank Limited
 Discovery Limited
 First National Bank
 FirstRand Bank - A subsidiary of First Rand Limited
 Grindrod Bank Limited
 Imperial Bank South Africa	
 Investec Bank Limited
 Mercantile Bank Limited	
 Nedbank Limited
 Sasfin Bank Limited
 Standard Bank of South Africa
 Ubank Limited
 TymeBank

Co-operative banks 
 Ditsobotla Primary Savings and Credit Co-operative Bank
 OSK Koöperatiewe Bank Beperk

Foreign-controlled banks 
 Al Baraka Banking Group
 Habib Overseas Bank Limited
 Habib Bank AG Zurich
 Access Bank South Africa

Branches of foreign banks 
 Bank of Baroda	
 Bank of China 
 Bank of Taiwan
 BNP Paribas
 Calyon Corporate and Investment Bank
 China Construction Bank Corporation
 Citibank N.A.
 Deutsche Bank AG
 JPMorgan Chase Bank
 Société Générale
 Standard Chartered Bank
 State Bank of India	
 Hongkong and Shanghai Banking Corporation (HSBC)
 Colorado Bank

Foreign Bank Representatives 
  AfrAsia Bank Limited 
 Banco Africano de Investimentos 
 Banco BIC 
 Banco BPI SA 
 Banco Espirito Santo e Comercial de Lisboa 
 Banco Santander Totta S.A. 
 Bank Leumi Le-Israel BM 
 Bank of America 
 Bank of Cyprus Group 
 Bank of India 
 Barclays Bank Plc 
 Barclays Private Clients International Limited 
 Commerzbank AG Johannesburg 
 Credit Suisse AG 
 Ecobank 
 Export-Import Bank of India 
 Fairbairn Private Bank (Isle of Man) Limited
 Fairbairn Private Bank (Jersey) Limited
 First Bank of Nigeria 
 First City Monument Bank Plc 
 Hellenic Bank Public Company Limited 
  HSBC Bank International Limited 
 ICICI Bank Limited 
 Industrial and Commercial Bank of China 
  KfW Ipex-Bank GmbH 
 Lloyds TSB Offshore Limited 
 Mauritius Commercial Bank Limited 
 Mukuru
 Millennium BCP 
 National Bank of Egypt 
 NATIXIS 
 Royal Bank of Scotland International Limited 
 Société Générale
 Sumitomo Mitsui Banking Corporation 
 The Bank of New York Mellon 
 The Bank of Tokyo-Mitsubishi UFJ Limited
 The Mizuho Bank Limited
 The Export-Import Bank of China 
 The Royal Bank of Scotland N.V. 
 UBS AG 
 Unicredit Bank AG 
 Union Bank of Nigeria Plc 
 Wells Fargo Bank 
 Zenith Bank Plc

Mutual banks 
GBS Mutual Bank
VBS Mutual Bank
Finbond Mutual Bank
Bank Zero

State-owned banks 
Development Bank of Southern Africa
Land and Agricultural Development Bank of South Africa
Postbank

See also
 Banking in South Africa
 List of banks in Africa
 South African Reserve Bank
 BankservAfrica

References

External links
 Website of Reserve Bank of South Africa
 Classification of South African Financial Institutions

LIst
South Africa
Banks
South Africa